The 1972–73 I liga was the 47th season of the Polish Football Championship and the 39th season of the I liga, the top Polish professional league for association football clubs, since its establishment in 1927. The league was operated by the Polish Football Association (PZPN).

The champions were Stal Mielec, who won their 1st Polish title.

Competition modus
The season started on 26 July 1972 and concluded on 24 June 1973 (autumn-spring league). The season was played as a round-robin tournament. The team at the top of the standings won the league title. A total of 14 teams participated, 12 of which competed in the league during the 1971–72 season, while the remaining two were promoted from the 1971–72 II liga. Each team played a total of 26 matches, half at home and half away, two games against each other team. Teams received two points for a win and one point for a draw.

League table

Results

Relegation playoffs
At the end of the first and second division season, the play-off was played between:
 the 13th placed team in the I liga and the 4th team in the II liga
 the 14th placed team in the I liga and the 3rd team in the II liga

|}

Top goalscorers

References

Bibliography

External links
 Poland – List of final tables at RSSSF 
 List of Polish football championships 
 History of the Polish League 
 List of Polish football championships 

Ekstraklasa seasons
1
Pol